The men's hammer throw event at the 2001 European Athletics U23 Championships was held in Amsterdam, Netherlands, at Olympisch Stadion on 14 and 15 July.

Medalists

Results

Final
15 July

Qualifications
14 July
Qualifying 72.00 or 12 best to the Final

Group A

Group B

Participation
According to an unofficial count, 19 athletes from 13 countries participated in the event.

 (2)
 (1)
 (2)
 (3)
 (2)
 (1)
 (2)
 (1)
 (1)
 (1)
 (1)
 (1)
 (1)

References

Hammer throw
Hammer throw at the European Athletics U23 Championships